Aksel Madsen (9 April 1927 – 5 November 1977) was a Danish footballer. He played in one match for the Denmark national football team in 1949.

References

External links
 

1927 births
1977 deaths
Danish men's footballers
Denmark international footballers
Place of birth missing
Association footballers not categorized by position